John Cooper Godbold  (March 24, 1920 – December 22, 2009) was a United States circuit judge of the United States Court of Appeals for the Eleventh Circuit and the United States Court of Appeals for the Fifth Circuit.

Education and career

Born in Coy, Alabama, Godbold received a Bachelor of Science degree from Auburn University in 1940 and was a Major in the United States Army, Division Artillery Headquarters during World War II, from 1941 to 1946. He received a Juris Doctor from Harvard Law School in 1948, and was in private practice in Montgomery, Alabama from 1948 to 1966.

Federal judicial service

Godbold was nominated by President Lyndon B. Johnson on June 28, 1966, to a seat on the United States Court of Appeals for the Fifth Circuit vacated by Judge Richard Rives. He was confirmed by the United States Senate on July 22, 1966, and received his commission the same day. He served as a board member of the Federal Judicial Center from 1976 to 1981. He served as Chief Judge in 1981. He was reassigned by operation of law to the United States Court of Appeals for the Eleventh Circuit on October 1, 1981. He served as Chief Judge and a member of the Judicial Conference of the United States from 1981 to 1986. He assumed senior status on October 23, 1987. He was Director of the Federal Judicial Center from 1987 to 1990. His service terminated on December 22, 2009, due to his death in Montgomery.

Other service

Concurrent with his federal judicial service, Godbold was a Professor of Law at the Cumberland School of Law at Samford University from 1990 until his death.

References

Sources
 

1920 births
2009 deaths
People from Wilcox County, Alabama
Military personnel from Alabama
Auburn University alumni
Harvard Law School alumni
Judges of the United States Court of Appeals for the Fifth Circuit
Judges of the United States Court of Appeals for the Eleventh Circuit
United States court of appeals judges appointed by Lyndon B. Johnson
20th-century American judges
United States Army officers
United States Army personnel of World War II